Scott Taggart (born 27 December 1991) is a Scottish footballer who plays for Alloa Athletic. Taggart can play as either a defender or a midfielder.

Taggart has previously played for Hibernian, Greenock Morton and Dumbarton, as well as Ayr United and Stranraer on loan.

Career
Taggart was signed by Hibernian after impressing in a match against their youth team. He was part of the Hibs youth team that won a league and cup double in 2008–09. Taggart went out on loan to Ayr United during the 2010–11 season. He made six league appearances for the Scottish Second Division side. He made his first team debut for Hibs on 7 May 2011, as a substitute against Hamilton.

In September 2011, Taggart went on a three-month loan to Scottish Third Division side Stranraer. He made his debut on 26 September, in their 1–0 victory against Elgin City. He scored his first senior goal on 10 December 2011, in a 6–0 win for Stranraer against East Stirlingshire. His loan spell ended on 23 December and he returned to Hibs, but he was again loaned to Stranraer in January 2012. Taggart scored for Stranraer in the first appearance of his second spell with them, in a 5–2 win against Elgin City on 28 January. He returned to Hibs at the end of this second loan, but was released at the end of his contract in May 2012.

Taggart signed for Greenock Morton in July 2012. He played regularly as Morton performed well during the 2012–13 Scottish First Division. Taggart left Morton after rejecting a new deal in June 2014.

On 21 June 2014, Taggart signed for Dumbarton. He made his league debut in a 4–1 defeat to Rangers at Ibrox and scored his first goal for the club in a 3–3 draw with Falkirk in January 2015.

After two seasons with the side Taggart left Dumbarton in May 2016, signing for Scottish League One side Alloa Athletic shortly after.

Career statistics

Honours

Club
Morton
Scottish Football League First Division: Runners-Up 2012–13

Individual
PFA Scotland League One Team of the Year: 2017–18

References

External links

1991 births
Living people
People from Kilsyth
Association football defenders
Scottish footballers
Hibernian F.C. players
Ayr United F.C. players
Stranraer F.C. players
Greenock Morton F.C. players
Dumbarton F.C. players
Alloa Athletic F.C. players
Scottish Premier League players
Scottish Football League players
Scottish Professional Football League players
Footballers from North Lanarkshire